Serhiy Trykosh (born 12 October 1998) is a professional Ukrainian football midfielder who plays for the Ukrainian amateur club Nyva Terebovlya.

Trykosh is a product of the BRW-BIK Volodymyr-Volynskyi and FC Volyn Youth Sportive School Systems. Then he signed a professional contract with  FC Volyn Lutsk in the Ukrainian Premier League.

He made his debut in the Ukrainian Premier League for FC Volyn on 20 May 2017, played in the match against FC Zirka Kropyvnytskyi.

References

External links
Profile at Official FFU Site (Ukr)

Living people
1998 births
Ukrainian footballers
Association football midfielders
Ukrainian Premier League players
FC Volyn Lutsk players